Afyonkarahisar District (also: Merkez, meaning "central") is a district of Afyonkarahisar Province of Turkey. Its seat is the city Afyonkarahisar. Its area is 1,261 km2, and its population is 319,574 (2021).

Composition
There are 15 municipalities in Afyonkarahisar District:

 Afyonkarahisar
 Beyyazı
 Çayırbağ
 Çıkrık
 Değirmenayvalı
 Erkmen
 Fethibey
 Gebeceler
 Işıklar
 Kocatepe
 Nuribey
 Salar
 Susuz
 Sülümenli
 Sülün

There are 22 villages in Afyonkarahisar District:

 Alcalı
 Anıtkaya
 Bayramgazi
 Belkaracaören
 Bostanlı
 Burhaniye
 Çavdarlı
 Değirmendere
 Gözsüzlü
 Halımoru
 Kaplanlı
 Karaarslan
 Kızıldağ
 Kozluca
 Köprülü
 Küçükkalecik
 Olucak
 Omuzca
 Saadet
 Saraydüzü
 Sarık
 Yarımca

References

Districts of Afyonkarahisar Province